The Assignment (Swedish: Uppdraget ) is a 1977 Swedish drama film directed by Mats Arehn and starring Christopher Plummer, Thomas Hellberg and Carolyn Seymour. A Swedish foreign office official travels to South America on a peace-making mission. It was based on the novel Uppdraget  by Per Wahlöö.

Cast
 Christopher Plummer ...  Captain Behounek
 Thomas Hellberg ...  Erik Dalgren
 Carolyn Seymour ...  Danica Rodriguez
 Fernando Rey ...  Roberto Bidara
 Per Oscarsson ...  Sixto
 Sten Johan Hedman ...  Lopez
 Walter Gotell ...  Frankenheimer
 Lauritz Falk ...  De Mare
 Palle Granditsky ...  Hammar
 Rosette Graboi ...  Francisca
 Gabor Vernon ...  General Gami
 Johan Clason ...  Fernandez
 Miguel Franco ...  Larrinaga's Murderer
 Stefan Gryff ...  Ortega (as Stephen Gryff)
 David Swift ...  Zaforteza

References

External links

1977 films
1977 drama films
1970s Swedish-language films
Films based on Swedish novels
Films directed by Mats Arehn
Swedish drama films
1970s Swedish films